Daniel Cook may refer to:

 Daniel Cook (gymnast), British acrobatic gymnast
 Daniel Cook (musician) (born 1979), English organist, conductor and singer
 Daniel Pope Cook (1794–1827), American politician, lawyer and newspaper publisher from Illinois
 Dan Cook (1926–2008), American sports writer
 Daniel Cook (EastEnders), a character on EastEnders

See also
 This is Daniel Cook, a children's television series